Penicillium atrovenetum is a fungus species of the genus of Penicillium.

See also
List of Penicillium species

References

Further reading

 H. Raistrick, A. Stössl: Studies in the biochemistry of micro-organisms. 104. Metabolites of Penicillium atrovenetum G. Smith: β-nitropropionic acid, a major metabolite*

atrovenetum
Fungi described in 1956